Orchestes is a genus of beetles either classified in the subfamily Rhynchaeninae or in the tribe Rhamphini of the subfamily Curculioninae, of the family Curculionidae. It encompasses six species in North America, including Orchestes alni, and more in Eurasia. It was previously regarded as a synonym of Rhynchaenus, which is now used with a more restricted definition. The name Pedetes (normally used for the springhares) has been used as a manuscript name for this genus around 1799, but not published as a valid name.

Species

 Orchestes affinis
 Orchestes africanus
 Orchestes alboscutellatus
 Orchestes alni
 Orchestes amplithorax
 Orchestes amurensis
 Orchestes angustifrons
 Orchestes animosus
 Orchestes anoploidens
 Orchestes aterrimus
 Orchestes atricapillus
 Orchestes australiae
 Orchestes avellanae
 Orchestes betuleti
 Orchestes bifasciatus
 Orchestes bimaculatus
 Orchestes calcar
 Orchestes calceatus
 Orchestes camerunicus
 Orchestes carnifex
 Orchestes cinereus
 Orchestes confinis
 Orchestes confundatus
 Orchestes crassus
 Orchestes crinitus
 Orchestes decoratus
 Orchestes depressus
 Orchestes distans
 Orchestes ephippiatus
 Orchestes erythropus
 Orchestes fagi
 Orchestes fasciculatus
 Orchestes ferrugineus
 Orchestes flavescens
 Orchestes flavus
 Orchestes foedatus
 Orchestes fragariae
 Orchestes harunire
 Orchestes haematicus
 Orchestes horii
 Orchestes horridus
 Orchestes hortorum
 Orchestes hustachei
 Orchestes ilicis
 Orchestes illinoisensis
 Orchestes japonicus
 Orchestes jota
 Orchestes koltzei
 Orchestes lateritius
 Orchestes lecontei
 Orchestes lonicerae
 Orchestes maurus
 Orchestes melancholicus
 Orchestes melanocephalus
 Orchestes mixtus
 Orchestes mollis
 Orchestes monedula
 Orchestes mutabilis
 Orchestes nigricollis
 Orchestes nigriventris
 Orchestes nitens
 Orchestes ornatus
 Orchestes pacificus
 Orchestes pallicornis
 Orchestes pallidior
 Orchestes peregrinus
 Orchestes perpusillus
 Orchestes pilosus
 Orchestes plantaris
 Orchestes populi
 Orchestes pratensis
 Orchestes puberulus
 Orchestes pubescens
 Orchestes pulicarius
 Orchestes quercus
 Orchestes rhodopus
 Orchestes rufescens
 Orchestes ruficornis
 Orchestes rufipennis
 Orchestes rufitarsis
 Orchestes rufus
 Orchestes rugosus
 Orchestes rusci
 Orchestes saliceti
 Orchestes salicis
 Orchestes salicola
 Orchestes sanguinipes
 Orchestes scitus
 Orchestes scutellaris
 Orchestes semirufus
 Orchestes signatus
 Orchestes signifer
 Orchestes similis
 Orchestes sparsus
 Orchestes spinosus
 Orchestes stigma
 Orchestes subfasciatus
 Orchestes suturalis
 Orchestes tomentosus
 Orchestes uniformis
 Orchestes waltoni
 Orchestes weidenbachianus
 Orchestes vestitus
 Orchestes viminalis
 Orchestes x-album

References

Literature cited
 Anderson, R.S. 1989. Revision of the subfamily Rhynchaeninae in North America (Coleoptera: Curculionidae) (subscription required). Transactions of the American Entomological Society 115(3):207–312.
 Anderson, R.S., O'Brien, C.W., Salsbury, G.A. and Krauth, S.J. 2007. Orchestes alni (L.) newly discovered in North America (Coleoptera: Curculionidae) (subscription required). Journal of the Kansas Entomological Society 80(1):78–79.
 Creutzer, C. 1799. Entomologische Versuche. Schaumburg und comp.
 Crotch, G.R. 1870. The genera of Coleoptera studied chronologically (1735–1801). Transactions of the Royal Entomological Society of London 1870(1):41–52.

External links
 

Curculioninae
Taxa named by Johann Karl Wilhelm Illiger